Sedna is a monotypic genus of ammotrechid camel spiders, first described by Martin Hammond Muma in 1971. Its single species, Sedna pirata is distributed in Chile.

References 

Solifugae
Animals described in 1971
Arthropods of Chile